Powerlong Real Estate Holdings Limited is a Fujian-based Chinese real estate development company, listed on the Hong Kong stock exchange.

Powerlong was founded in Macau by Xu Jiankang (Hoi Kin Hong) in 1990. It employs 9,718 people, and has a land bank of 14.1 million square meters.

In November 2017, it opened the 23,000 square meter Powerlong Art Museum in Qibao, Shanghai.

References

Companies based in Fujian
Companies listed on the Hong Kong Stock Exchange
Chinese companies established in 1990
Real estate companies of China